Ataenius cognatus, the slender dung beetle, is a species of aphodiine dung beetle in the family Scarabaeidae. It is found in Central America, North America, and Oceania.

References

Further reading

 

Scarabaeidae
Articles created by Qbugbot
Beetles described in 1858